Olivier Jean Blanchard (born December 27, 1948) is a French economist and professor who is a senior fellow at the Peterson Institute for International Economics. He was the chief economist at the International Monetary Fund from September 1, 2008, to September 8, 2015. Blanchard was appointed to the position under the tenure of Dominique Strauss-Kahn; he was succeeded by Maurice Obstfeld. He is also a Robert M. Solow Professor of Economics emeritus at the Massachusetts Institute of Technology (MIT). According to IDEAS/RePEc, he is one of the most cited economists in the world.

Career

Blanchard graduated from ESCP in 1970. From 1970 to 1973, he completed graduate level courses in economics and applied mathematics at Paris Dauphine University and Paris Nanterre University.  He obtained a PhD in economics from MIT in 1977 and then taught at Harvard University between 1977 and 1983, after which time he returned to MIT as a professor. His areas of expertise in macroeconomics are the functions of monetary policy, the role of speculative bubbles, the determinants of unemployment and the role of the labor market as a whole, the effects on countries who have transitioned away from communism, and the factors that have sparked the most recent global financial crises. Between 1998 and 2003 Blanchard served as the chairman of the economics department at MIT.

Blanchard has published numerous research papers in the field of macroeconomics, as well as undergraduate and graduate macroeconomics textbooks. In 1987, together with Nobuhiro Kiyotaki, Blanchard demonstrated the importance of monopolistic competition for the aggregate demand multiplier. Most New Keynesian macroeconomic models now assume monopolistic competition for the reasons outlined by them.

He is a fellow and past Council member of the Econometric Society, and a member of the American Academy of Arts and Sciences.

International Monetary Fund

During his tenure as chief economist, Blanchard's reshaped IMF policies. During the Great Recession Blanchard supported global fiscal stimulus. During its slow recovery he urged a cautious removal of stimulus and advocated quantitative easing.

Austerity v. stimulus debate
By 2010, following the financial crisis, many countries ran significant budget deficits. There was a global turn to austerity as Washington Consensus economists encouraged governments to cut spending and raise taxes to avoid a government debt crisis, as occurred in  Greece. In June 2010, Blanchard and Carlo Cottarelli, the director of the IMF's fiscal affairs department, co-authored an IMF blog post entitled "Ten Commandments for Fiscal Adjustment in Advanced Economies."

By 2011 Paul Krugman noted that Blanchard was already "suggesting that harsh austerity programs may be literally self-defeating, hurting the economy so much that they worsen fiscal prospects." Krugman thinks that by 2012, every country that had introduced "significant austerity" had suffered economically, and that Blanchard had issued "what amounted to a mea culpa." According to Krugman, "the IMF now believes that it massively understated the damage that spending cuts inflict on a weak economy." On the other hand, the IMF under Blanchard in 2014 was forced to admit that it had overestimated the negative effects of austerity – the IMF had warned of low growth because the British government did not spend enough, but in the end, the British economy grew much larger than the IMF had predicted. IMF-head Christine Lagarde apologized to the British government for the mistake.

Inequality

Under Blanchard's tenure at IMF, Jonathan D. Ostry and Andy Berg published their findings that "inequality was detrimental to sustained growth." By April 2014, in the World Economic Outlook, Blanchard situated inequality as a "central issue" for "macroeconomic developments."

References

External links 

 Olivier Blanchard's webpage at the Peterson Institute for International Economics

|-

1948 births
20th-century French economists
21st-century French  economists
ESCP Europe alumni
Expatriate academics in the United States
Fellows of the American Academy of Arts and Sciences
Fellows of the Econometric Society
French academics
French officials of the United Nations
Harvard University faculty
International Monetary Fund people
Labor economists
Living people
Macroeconomists
MIT School of Humanities, Arts, and Social Sciences alumni
MIT School of Humanities, Arts, and Social Sciences faculty
New Keynesian economists
Paris Dauphine University alumni
People from Amiens
Peterson Institute for International Economics
Presidents of the American Economic Association